The Anti-Jacobin Review and Magazine, or, Monthly Political and Literary Censor, was a conservative British political periodical active from 1798 to 1821. Founded founded by John Gifford (pseud. of John Richards Green) after the demise of William Gifford's The Anti-Jacobin, or, Weekly Examiner, the journal contained essays, reviews, and satirical engravings. It has been described as "often scurrilous" and "ultra-Tory" and was a vocal element of the British Anti-Jacobin backlash against the ideals of the French Revolution.

History 
The first edition was published on 1 August 1798 and was advertised in The Times as "containing Original Criticism; a Review of the Reviewers; Miscellaneous Matter in Prose and Verse, Lists of Marriages, Births, Deaths and Promotions; and a Summary of Foreign and Domestic Politics." Gifford served as its editor until 1806. The periodical was covertly funded by the British government.

Contributors included Robert Bisset (1758/9–1805), John Bowles (1751–1819), Arthur Cayley (1776–1848), James Gillray, George Gleig, Samuel Henshall (1764/5–1807), James Hurdis, James Mill, John Oxlee (1779–1854), Richard Penn (1733/4–1811), Richard Polwhele, John Skinner (1744–1816), William Stevens (1732–1807), and John Whitaker (1735–1808), though as items were frequently published anonymously attributions are often unclear.

Positions 
Gifford called the periodical a champion of "religion, morality, and social order, as supported by the existing establishments, ecclesiastical and civil, of this country

The periodical promoted conspiracy theories of attempts to establish Jacobinism in Britain, accusing the Monthly Review, the Analytical Review, and The Critical Review of spreading Jacobinism through "secret channels, disguised in various ways." It supported the passage of the Unlawful Societies Act 1799 and the Combination Act 1799, arguing that the state needed the "wisdom to repress" in order to effectively defeat "domestic traitors."

It also opposed the Irish Rebellion of 1798.

Reception 
The periodical denounced reformers, especially the Evangelicals, and greatly angered them, as William Wilberforce, a leader of the anti-slavery movement, made clear in 1800:
It is a most mischievous publication, which, by dint of assuming a tone of the highest loyalty and attachment to our establishment in church and state, secures a prejudice in its favour, and has declared war against what I think the most respectable and most useful of all orders of men--the serious clergy of the Church of England. . . . Its opposition to the evangelical clergy is carried on in so venomous a way, and with so much impudence, and so little regard to truth, that the mischief it does is very great indeed. It accuses them in the plainest terms, and sometimes by name, as being disaffected both to church and state.

References

Bibliography
Stephen, Leslie. “Gifford, John (1758–1818).” Rev. Adam I. P. Smith. Oxford Dictionary of National Biography. Ed. H. C. G. Matthew and Brian Harrison. Oxford: OUP, 2004. 7 May 2007.
Strachan, John. “Gifford, William (1756–1826).” Oxford Dictionary of National Biography. Ed. H. C. G. Matthew and Brian Harrison. Oxford: OUP, 2004. Online ed. Ed. Lawrence Goldman. May 2006. 7 May 2007.

Further reading
Andrews, Stuart. The British Periodical Press and the French Revolution, 1789–99. New York: Palgrave, 2000. 

1798 establishments in Great Britain
1821 disestablishments in the United Kingdom
Conservative magazines published in the United Kingdom
British political satire
Defunct political magazines published in the United Kingdom
Magazines established in 1798
Magazines disestablished in 1821